The King’s County and Ormonde Tournament  also called Midland Counties Championships Ireland was an early men's tennis tournament held in Parsonstown, King’s County, Ireland from 1883 through 1896.

History
The King’s County and Ormonde Tournament was a brief pre-open era tennis tournament played on outdoor grass courts in Parsonstown, King’s County, Ireland there were nine editions of this event.

Past tournaments
Incomplete list of tournaments included:

Men's singles

Notes

References
Citations

Sources
 Archives, Tennis (2017). "King's County and Ormonde Tournament, 1883-1896". www.tennisarchives.com.

Grass court tennis tournaments
Tennis tournaments in Ireland
1883 establishments in Ireland
Defunct tennis tournaments in the Republic of Ireland
Defunct sports competitions in the Republic of Ireland
Recurring sporting events established in 1883
1896 disestablishments in Ireland
Recurring sporting events disestablished in 1896